The Green Party of Mississippi is a state political party in Mississippi, United States. It is the Mississippi affiliate of the Green Party of the United States. The Green Party was officially recognized by the state government in April 2002 and granted ballot access.

In 2003, Sherman Lee Dillon was the Green Party nominee for governor. He received 3,909 votes (0.44%) and finished with the fewest votes of the five ballot-qualified candidates.

John M. Wages, Jr. was elected in 2004 as Election Commissioner in the 3rd Supervisor District of Lee County.

In 2011, members of the Green Party of Mississippi went to the state capitol in an effort to convince lawmakers to support net energy metering.

In 2016, the Party's candidate for president was Dr. Jill Stein.

Presidential election results

References

Political parties in Mississippi
Mississippi
2002 establishments in Mississippi
Political parties established in 2002